Whitianga Aerodrome  serves the town of Whitianga, New Zealand. The aerodrome is located 1.5 NM west of Whitianga on the eastern side of the Coromandel Peninsula in the North Island of New Zealand.

The aerodrome is operated by the Mercury Bay Aero Club. The aerodrome is popular with model aircraft enthusiasts and glider pilots.

Airlines and destinations

Air Auckland bases an aircraft at Whitianga used for both scheduled services and sightseeing charters.

See also

 List of airports in New Zealand
 List of airlines of New Zealand
 Transport in New Zealand

References

Airports in New Zealand
Thames-Coromandel District
Transport buildings and structures in Waikato